Moelleriopsis vemae is a species of sea snail, a marine gastropod mollusk, unassigned in the superfamily Seguenzioidea.

Description
The shell grows to a height of 1.8 mm.

Distribution
This species occurs in the South Atlantic Ocean at bathyal depths.

References

 Engl W. (2012) Shells of Antarctica. Hackenheim: Conchbooks. 402 pp.

External links
  Census of Marine Life (2012). SYNDEEP: Towards a first global synthesis of biodiversity, biogeography and ecosystem function in the deep sea

vernae
Gastropods described in 1961